John Burton Martyn (July 22, 1867 – 1921) was an Ontario physician and political figure. He represented Lambton East in the Legislative Assembly of Ontario from 1914 to 1919 as a Conservative member.

He was born in Strathroy, Ontario and moved to Alvinston with his family in 1874. He studied medicine at Trinity College, receiving his M.D. He set up practice in Walkerton, returning to Alvinston in 1893. He retired from practice in 1916. Martyn was a prominent member of the Masonic Order.

He was defeated by Robert John McCormick for the provincial seat in 1911 but defeated McCormick in 1914. He was unsuccessful in his bid for reelection in 1919, losing to Leslie Warner Oke of the United Farmers of Ontario. He died of pneumonia in 1921.

References

External links 

Lambton County's Hundred Years, 1849 - 1949, V Lauriston (1949)

1867 births
1921 deaths
Deaths from pneumonia in Ontario
Physicians from Ontario
Progressive Conservative Party of Ontario MPPs
Trinity College (Canada) alumni